Ricardo Matias Verón (born 22 January 1981 in Santa Fe) is an Argentine football midfielder.

Career

Verón started his professional career at San Lorenzo in the Primera Division Argentina in 1999. In 2001, he was sold to Reggina. He has spent time on loan at Salernitana in Italy, at Lanús and San Lorenzo in Argentina, at Serie B side F.C. Crotone. He played in Siena on a co-ownership deal with Reggina.

On 22 January 2008, incidentally his birthday, Veron signed for Greek club PAOK on a loan deal. After a quite successful 6-month period, PAOK came to terms with Siena and Matias signed a new three-year contract, in the summer of 2008. He has gradually become a mainstay in the midfield, being one of the most-capped players of the 2008–2009 season.
The 2009–2010 season has not been equally successful though, as Veron has fallen out of favor and rarely makes any appearances, even as a substitute. In July 2010, a new chapter in Veron's career started, as he moved to OFI Crete, the historic club from Crete, Greece.

Clausura 2001

The highlight of his career to date was being part of the San Lorenzo squad that won the 2001 Primera Division Clausura tournament.

References

External links
 Argentine Primera statistics
 

Argentine footballers
Argentine expatriate footballers
Association football midfielders
Association football goalkeepers
PAOK FC players
OFI Crete F.C. players
San Lorenzo de Almagro footballers
Club Atlético Lanús footballers
Argentine Primera División players
Serie A players
Serie B players
Super League Greece players
Reggina 1914 players
U.S. Salernitana 1919 players
F.C. Crotone players
A.C.N. Siena 1904 players
Expatriate footballers in Italy
Expatriate footballers in Greece
Argentine expatriate sportspeople in Greece
Argentine expatriate sportspeople in Italy
Footballers from Santa Fe, Argentina
1981 births
Living people